Pearkes is both a given name and surname. Notable people with the name include: 

George Pearkes (1888–1984), Canadian politician and general
Pearkes Gundry (1837–1891), English cricketer